Chopped liver (gehakte leber) is a liver pâté popular in Ashkenazic cuisine.   This dish is a common menu item in kosher Jewish delicatessens in Britain, Canada, South Africa, and the United States.

Preparation and serving 
The dish is often made by sautéing or broiling liver and onions, adding hard-boiled eggs, salt and pepper, and grinding that mixture. The liver used is generally veal, beef, or chicken.

The quintessential fat used is schmaltz, but different methods and materials exist, and the exact process and ingredients may vary from chef to chef. 

Chopped liver is often served on matzah, or with rye bread as sandwiches.

Variations and alternatives
Chopped liver is high in protein, but also high in fat and cholesterol. There are low-fat, mock and vegetarian alternatives, often made of a combination of peas, string beans, eggplant, or mushrooms.

Chopped liver as an expression
Since eating chopped liver may not be appreciated by everyone, the Jewish English expression "What am I, chopped liver?" signifies frustration or anger at being ignored on a social level.

An explanation of the expression is that chopped liver was traditionally served as a side dish rather than a main course. The phrase therefore may have originally expressed a feeling of being overlooked, as a "side dish".

The origin of the expression is difficult to trace, with many spoken references in older television, comedy and cinema not written down.

Similar dishes
 Foie gras
 Leberpastete
 Liverwurst
 Maksalaatikko
 Pâté

References

Appetizers
Ashkenazi Jewish cuisine
Food paste
Liver (food)
Shabbat food
Spreads (food)